Macbeth is a 2015 epic historical drama film directed by Justin Kurzel and written for the screen by Jacob Koskoff, Todd Louiso and Michael Lesslie, based on William Shakespeare's play of the same name. The film stars Michael Fassbender in the title role and Marion Cotillard as Lady Macbeth, with Paddy Considine, Sean Harris, Jack Reynor, Elizabeth Debicki and David Thewlis in supporting roles. The story follows a Scottish lord's rise to power after receiving a prophecy from a trio of witches that one day he will become King of Scotland. Like the play it was adapted from, the film dramatises the damaging physical and psychological effects of political ambition on those who seek power for its own sake.

Macbeth premiered on 23 May 2015 at the Cannes Film Festival where it was selected to compete for the Palme d'Or. The film was theatrically released by StudioCanal on 2 October 2015 in the United Kingdom and on 18 November 2015 in France. It received generally positive reviews from film critics who praised both Fassbender and Cotillard's performances, as well as those of the rest of the cast, visual style, script, direction and war sequences. Despite the positive critical reaction, the film grossed just $16 million worldwide against its production budget of $20 million.

Plot

Act I
The film starts with the Macbeths grieving at their child's funeral. Then, Macbeth leads King Duncan's troops into a civil war battle. He emerges victorious, despite losses, including boy soldiers. Three women with a girl and infant approach Macbeth and Banquo, hailing Macbeth as Thane of Cawdor and future King, and Banquo as a father of Kings, before disappearing.

Act II
Duncan hears of Macbeth's victory and executes the Thane of Cawdor for traitorously allying with Norse invaders, giving Macbeth his title. Macbeth tells his wife of the prophecies. Lady Macbeth prays to the dark spirits for guidance. When Macbeth says Duncan will stay overnight, she urges him to kill the King to fulfill the prophecy. A feast is held, where the King pronounces Malcolm his heir. Macbeth hesitates but Lady Macbeth persuades him to kill Duncan while she drugs his servants. After the feast, Macbeth sees a boy soldier's ghost, who gives him a dagger and leads him towards Duncan's tent whom Macbeth slays. Malcolm enters and, seeing the body, flees. Shaken, Macbeth goes to his wife, giving her two daggers. Lady Macbeth rebukes him for not leaving them and puts them in the sleeping servants' hands. She meets Macbeth in the church where they wash their hands, saying they have washed their deed away.

Act III
In the morning, Macduff finds Duncan dead and Macbeth slaughters the servants to prevent their denial. Macduff and noble Lennox believe Malcolm's flight is suspicious and admire Macbeth's summary justice. With Malcolm gone, Macbeth is crowned. Afterwards, he sourly complains to his wife that killing Duncan was for nothing as Macbeth has no heirs, so the crown will pass to Banquo and his son, Fleance, as prophesied. He invites them to a banquet but discovers they plan to leave, as Banquo is suspicious. Macbeth sends assassins: Banquo is killed, but Fleance escapes.
During the evening, Macbeth mentions Banquo not attending as promised. Macbeth asks the assassins for news and is enraged that Fleance has escaped. Then, Macbeth sees Banquo's ghost. Afraid, he talks to it. Lady Macbeth says her husband is unwell, but Macbeth continues to rave, prompting Macduff and his wife to leave. Lady Macbeth dismisses the guests and takes Macbeth away.

Act IV
Macbeth talks to the witches. They show him a vision of slain soldiers who tell him to beware Macduff, and that Macbeth shall be King until Great Birnam Wood comes to the royal castle at Dunsinane Hill. The boy soldier's ghost who gave him the dagger tells Macbeth that he will not be slain by man born of a woman. The King is found wandering by Lennox who tells him that Macduff has fled. Anxious and enraged, Macbeth orders the death of Macduff's family and servants. The family are burned at the stake, while a distraught Lady Macbeth watches. Afterwards, she washes the dagger.
Meanwhile, Macduff meets Malcolm, who is gathering troops. Ross and Angus inform Macduff about his household's murder. Grief-stricken and angry, Macduff swears revenge.

Act V
Guilt-ridden, Lady Macbeth returns to the church, lamenting their deeds and her bloody hands (in a soliloquy often referred to as "Out damned spot!"). She sees her child's ghost, which she urges to sleep. Then she wanders in the hills and sees the witches.

In the castle, Macbeth is rumoured mad, and all fear his anger and tyranny. He is told of his wife's  death. Speaking the famous soliloquy, starting "tomorrow and tomorrow and tomorrow" (also known by the lines in it beginning "Out, out, brief candle!"), he carries her body in despair. Seyton brings news Malcolm is leading an army and Macbeth demands his armour.

Macduff fires Birnam Wood: with smoke blowing towards them, the prophecy is fulfilled. Macbeth sallies out and duels with Macduff. Macbeth is confident, as "no man born of woman" can kill him, and he defeats MacDuff, a dagger at his throat. Macduff states he was untimely ripped from his mother's womb and MacBeth drops his dagger, saying he won't fight (the prophecy). Macbeth regrets his mistakes, knowing redemption is impossible. Macbeth refuses to bow before Malcolm, allowing himself to be killed. The witches, observing, leave. Malcolm is hailed King and all go to his castle. Malcolm leaves the throne room while Fleance takes Macbeth's sword and charges through the empty battlefield, disappearing into the smoke.

Cast

Michael Fassbender as Macbeth
Marion Cotillard as Lady Macbeth
Paddy Considine as Banquo
Sean Harris as Macduff
Jack Reynor as Malcolm 
Elizabeth Debicki as Lady Macduff
David Thewlis as King Duncan
David Hayman as Lennox
Maurice Roëves as Menteith
Brian Nickels as Thane of Cawdor
Ross Anderson as Rosse
James Harkness as Angus
Seylan Mhairi Baxter, Lynn Kennedy, Kayla Fallon and Amber Rissmann as the Witches
Lochlann Harris as Fleance
Hilton McRae as Macdonwald
Scott Dymond as Seyton
Rebecca Benson as Maidservant
Gerard Miller as Macbeth's messenger
Roy Sampson as Doctor

Production
The production company behind Macbeth is See-Saw Films; the film was distributed by StudioCanal worldwide.

Filming
Principal photography took place over seven weeks in England and Scotland, beginning on 6 February 2014 in Scotland. On 21 February, filming took place at Hankley Common in Elstead, Surrey. On 26 February, the cast and crew were spotted on set at Bamburgh Castle in Northumberland with almost 200 extras. Other locations used include Quiraing in Skye, and Ely Cathedral in Ely, Cambridgeshire.

Costumes
Costume designer Jacqueline Durran was in charge of the costumes for the film. Durran took reference from a book called the Tilke, which is a sort of encyclopaedia of folk costume, compiled and illustrated in the 1920s by a German artist and ethnographer, Max Tilke.

Marketing
A couple of photos from the film were revealed on 18 April 2014, followed by two teaser posters on 14 May. The first trailer was released by StudioCanal on 4 June 2015 and crossed over 2 million views.

Character posters featuring Fassbender and Cotillard were released on 27 August 2015. The first North American trailer was released by The Weinstein Company on 1 September 2015. A new pair of posters were released on 4 September 2015. In the Philippines, the film was marketed as Macbeth: Warrior King.

Release

In October 2013, The Weinstein Company acquired distribution rights to the film. Macbeth premiered at the 2015 Cannes Film Festival on 23 May 2015 and was released in the United Kingdom on 2 October 2015 and in France on 18 November. The film had a limited release in the United States across five theatres in New York, Los Angeles and San Francisco on 4 December 2015, before expanding theatres on 11 December. The film was released in the Philippines by Pioneer Films on 13 January 2016.

Critical reception
Macbeth has received positive reviews from critics. The review aggregator Rotten Tomatoes, the film has an approval rating of 80% based on 198 reviews, with an average rating of 7.24/10. The site's critical consensus reads, "Faithful to the source material without sacrificing its own cinematic flair, Justin Kurzel's Macbeth rises on the strength of a mesmerizing Michael Fassbender performance to join the upper echelon of big-screen Shakespeare adaptations." Metacritic gives the film a weighted average score of 71 out of 100, based on 35 critics, indicating "generally favorable reviews".

Writing for The New York Times on 3 December 2015, Manohla Dargis complimented Fassbender's depiction of the lead role, stating:

Cotillard's performance also earned high praise from critics, particularly for her rendition of the famous "Out, Damned Spot" monologue. Guy Lodge from Variety stated that "Cotillard electrically conveys misdirected sexual magnetism, but also a poignantly defeated sense of decency", and noted that it was a performance that "contains both the woman's abandoned self and her worst-case incarnation, often in the space of a single scene," and remarked that "Her deathless sleepwalking scene, staged in minimalist fashion under a gauze of snowflakes in a bare chapel, is played with tender, desolate exhaustion; it deserves to be viewed as near-definitive."

Luke Buckmaster of The Daily Review rated the film four out of five stars, calling it "bold" and "fearless" and praising the production values as well as Fassbender and Cotillard's performances, but criticised the actors' poor enunciation or peculiar accents, which distracted from the film's other qualities.

Accolades

References

External links

Official screenplay

2015 films
French historical films
American historical drama films
British historical drama films
English-language French films
2015 war drama films
2010s historical drama films
British war drama films
Films about witchcraft
Films based on Macbeth
Films directed by Justin Kurzel
Films set in castles
Films set in Scotland
Films shot in Cambridgeshire
Films shot in Scotland
Films shot in Surrey
Film4 Productions films
2015 drama films
Films scored by Jed Kurzel
2010s English-language films
2010s American films
2010s British films
2010s French films